Tony Lâm (born 1936) is a politician from California. In 1992, he won a seat on the Westminster City Council, becoming the first Vietnamese-born person to be elected into a political office in the United States.

Prior to being elected, Lam had been living in America for 17 years, and owned the Vien Dong restaurant in Garden Grove. He was also a respected community leader, secretary of the Vietnamese Lions Club in Westminster, and the first vice president of the Vietnamese Chamber of Commerce in Orange County.

Although Westminster had one of the largest concentrations of Vietnamese immigrants in the United States, Lam was not primarily voted in by his fellow Vietnamese. His winning total was about 6,500 votes, but only 2,000 Vietnamese-Americans in the city were eligible to vote. His campaign had the backing of the police, the Mayor and local mobile-home owners. He defeated another Vietnamese candidate, Jimmy Tong Nguyen, for the Westminster City Council seat.

In 1999, Lam bore the fury of many Vietnamese immigrants when he refused to join in demonstrations protesting against a video store that displayed a poster of Ho Chi Minh and a communist Vietnamese flag. City attorneys had advised him to "stay neutral". For this, his restaurant was picketed, and people burnt effigies of him, calling him a "communist sympathizer". At the height of the controversy, the protesters raised the possibility of Lam's recall from office. Even his wife called on him to resign, but he refused.

Lam served for a decade on the City Council over three terms, until he decided not to seek re-election in 2002.

References

1937 births
Vietnamese emigrants to the United States
Living people
People from Westminster, California
California politicians of Vietnamese descent